Looking Glass Studios, Inc. (formerly Blue Sky Productions and LookingGlass Technologies, Inc.) was an American video game developer based in Cambridge, Massachusetts. The company was founded by Paul Neurath with Ned Lerner as Blue Sky Productions in 1990, and merged with Lerner's Lerner Research in 1992 to become LookingGlass Technologies. Between 1997 and 1999, the company was part of AverStar, where it was renamed Looking Glass Studios. Following financial issues at Looking Glass, the studio shut down in May 2000. Notable productions by Looking Glass include the Ultima Underworld, System Shock and Thief series.

History

Foundation and Ultima Underworld (1990–1992) 
Prior to founding Looking Glass, Paul Neurath worked with developer Origin Systems, while it was located in Southern New Hampshire, where he led the design on Space Rogue. Following the release of the game, Origin moved back to Texas, from which it originated, leaving Neurath with a studio, development tools and funding, using which he founded Blue Sky Productions in 1990 in Salem, New Hampshire. Ned Lerner, who had met Neurath in college, acted as founding partner for the company. Early on, Neurath hired Doug Church, a programmer from the Massachusetts Institute of Technology, to aid with Blue Sky's first project. Church created a technological base for this first game, while Doug Wike, formerly of Origin Systems, created an animation sequence of a creature moving towards the player in real time. Blue Sky showcased a demonstration of their game at the 1990 Consumer Electronics Show, attracting Richard Garriot and Warren Spector of Origin, who signed them into a publishing deal. Origin provided Blue Sky with the license for their Ultima series, wherein the game received the name Ultima Underworld: The Stygian Abyss, and Blue Sky received  in project funding. The production for Ultima Underworld, which released in 1992, would eventually cost .

Rebranding and expansion (1992–1995) 
In 1992, Blue Sky merged with Lerner Research, a video game company Lerner had founded after graduating from college, and was rebranded as LookingGlass Technologies. Neurath considered this a formalization, as the two companies had already been sharing technology and staff for some time. It had also considered using the name "LookingGlass Studios" but decided against using it as it was mostly focused on technology. At the time, the studio had approximately 12 employees in offices located in Lexington, Massachusetts. The first game to be released under the new branding was Ultima Underworld II: Labyrinth of Worlds in 1993. By April 1995, the company, now located in Cambridge, Massachusetts, employed over 40 people. When the company was acquired by Intermetrics, the company was legally renamed Intermetrics Entertainment Software, LLC, though received the trade name "Looking Glass Studios". It incorporated as Looking Glass Studios, Inc. when it became independent again.

Closure (2000) 
By 2000, Looking Glass's major financial losses and lack of external funding rendered the company unable to continue operating. Specifically, deals with Sony and Eidos Interactive fell apart, and a spy game project Deep Cover (to be developed by Irrational Games and published by Microsoft) was cancelled. Losses from Flight Combat and Flight Unlimited III, among many other contributing factors, also plagued the studio.

On Wednesday, May 24, 2000, Neurath called for a meeting attended by all employees. At the meeting, Neurath announced that Looking Glass was being closed down, and all employees left the facility later that day. Steve Pearsall, the project lead for Thief, confirmed the closure to the public on the same day.

Legacy 
In 1997, Ken Levine, Jonathan Chey and Robert Fermier split from Looking Glass to form Irrational Games. Jane's Attack Squadron, a game canceled with the studio's closure, was picked up and finished by Mad Doc Software. Following the closure of Looking Glass, Neurath founded Floodgate Entertainment, also in the Boston area. Floodgate was eventually acquired by Zynga and merged into Zynga Boston. Neurath became creative director of Zynga Boston, which eventually shut down in October 2012, after which Neurath established OtherSide Entertainment in 2013.

Games developed

By Lerner Research 
 Chuck Yeager's Advanced Flight Trainer (1987)
 F-22 Interceptor (1991)
 Car and Driver (1992)

By Blue Sky Productions 
 Ultima Underworld: The Stygian Abyss (1992)
 John Madden Football '93 (1992)

As LookingGlass Technologies (post-merger) 
 Ultima Underworld II: Labyrinth of Worlds (1993)
 System Shock (1994)
 Flight Unlimited (1995)
 Terra Nova: Strike Force Centauri (1996)
 British Open Championship Golf (1997)

As Looking Glass Studios (rename) 
 Flight Unlimited II (1997)
 Thief: The Dark Project (1998)
 Command & Conquer (N64 port; 1999)
 System Shock 2 (1999)
 Flight Unlimited III (1999)
 Destruction Derby 64 (1999)
 Thief II (2000)
 Jane's Attack Squadron (canceled, finished by Mad Doc Software in 2002)

References 

American companies established in 1990
American companies disestablished in 2000
Video game development companies
Video game companies established in 1990
Video game companies disestablished in 2000
Defunct video game companies of the United States
Companies based in Cambridge, Massachusetts
1990 establishments in Massachusetts
2000 disestablishments in Massachusetts
Defunct companies based in Massachusetts